Tahj Di Nero Miles is an English actor. He appeared in the first film of the anthology series Small Axe directed by Steve McQueen, and since 2021, has starred as Marlon Pryce in BBC1's TV series  Death in Paradise.

Life and work
Miles was born in Hackney, London and has Jamaican, St Lucian and Dominican heritage. He attended the Betty Layward Primary in Stoke Newington.  He joined the Anna Fiorentini Theatre and Film School at the age of seven, then signed for Fiorentini Agency. Miles performed in a West End production of Oliver!. He joined Disney’s Cub School and performed as Simba in a West End production of The Lion King for over a year. He was then in Matilda the Musical with the Royal Shakespeare Company at the Cambridge Theatre (2013) and Emil and the Detectives with the Royal National Theatre. He also secured advertising contracts with Lego and Sainsbury’s. He appeared in Bugsy Malone in the West End (2015), before studying at the BRIT School of performing arts. 

Miles was cast in the BBC's Class Dismissed and Flunked before joining the regular cast of BBC1's Death in Paradise as police officer Marlon Pryce He appeared in Steve McQueen's film anthology Small Axe.

Miles lives in Hackney, east London.

Filmography

Television

References

BBC television comedy
Black British male actors
British people of Dominica descent
British people of Dominican Republic descent
Male actors from London
English male musical theatre actors
English people of Jamaican descent
English people of Saint Lucian descent
People from Hackney, London
Living people
English male child actors
People educated at the BRIT School
Year of birth missing (living people)